Caridad "Cary" Rodriguez (born September 20, 1947) is an American Democratic Party politician, who served in the New Jersey General Assembly, where she represented the 33rd Legislative District from 2008 until she resigned to take office as a commissioner of West New York, New Jersey in May 2011.

Rodriguez and her running mates won a strongly fought primary battle in June 2007, defeating a slate supported by the Hudson County Democratic Organization led by then-Assemblyman Silverio Vega.

Rodriguez served in West New York as Commissioner of Parks and Public Property from 2006-07.

She served in the Assembly on the Human Services Committee (as Vice-Chair), the Transportation, Public Works and Independent Authorities Committee and the Intergovernmental Relations Commission.

She attended Union Hill High School and Berkeley College (Legal Secretary/Paralegal Studies).

References

External links
Assemblywoman Rodriguez's legislative web page, New Jersey Legislature
New Jersey Legislature financial disclosure forms
2010 2009 2008 2007

1947 births
Living people
Democratic Party members of the New Jersey General Assembly
New Jersey city council members
People from West New York, New Jersey
Politicians from Hudson County, New Jersey
Union Hill High School alumni
Women state legislators in New Jersey
Women city councillors in New Jersey
21st-century American politicians
21st-century American women politicians
Hispanic and Latino American state legislators in New Jersey
Hispanic and Latino American women in politics